Duets is a 2000 American road trip film co-produced and directed by Bruce Paltrow and written by John Byrum. The motion picture features an ensemble cast with Gwyneth Paltrow, Huey Lewis, Paul Giamatti, Maria Bello, Angie Dickinson, Scott Speedman, and Andre Braugher among others. The movie "revolves around the little known world of karaoke competitions and the wayward characters who inhabit it."

Plot
The story revolves around unrelated pairs of people who spend time in karaoke bars across the United States in the week leading up to a big contest in Omaha.
Ricky Dean (Huey Lewis), a hustler on the karaoke circuit, travels from town to town feigning ambivalence of karaoke, then winning both the contests and side bets with locals. Detoured by a phone call, he travels to Las Vegas for the funeral of an ex; while there, he meets his daughter Liv (Gwyneth Paltrow), with whom he has not had contact for many years.

Seeking a father figure after her mother's death, Liv joins him against his wishes on the road, both singing solos at karaoke bars. They are involved in a bar fight when one of Ricky's marks retaliates.
Depressed California salesman Todd Woods (Paul Giamatti), so exhausted from business travel he does not even know what city he is in. Arriving home, his wife Candy (Kiersten Warren) and two children are too self-absorbed to even say hello. He walks out on his family and his old life, driving aimlessly. He wanders into a karaoke bar in New Mexico, where a fellow participant offers beta blockers to help him overcome his anxiety and stage fright. Todd gets hooked on the drugs as he keeps driving.

In Utah, Todd picks up hitchhiker Reggie Kane (Andre Braugher), a charismatic but violent fugitive convict, who recently robbed at gunpoint a truck driver who gave him a lift. They form an unlikely friendship after Reggie reveals a beautiful singing voice during a duet at a karaoke bar. Todd's mental health deteriorates further as Reggie tries to keep him out of trouble; he first has to drag Todd out of a hotel when he threatens the clerk with a gun; then, after he causes a standoff at a service station, Reggie shoots and kills the attendant. Reggie arranges for Candy to meet them in Omaha, but an emotionless Todd rejects her, insisting he is finished with his former life.
Cincinnati-based underachieving cab driver and once aspiring priest Billy (Scott Speedman) goes on a drinking binge after catching his partner cheating on him. He meets Suzi Loomis (Maria Bello), a broke drifter who gets by on karaoke contest prizes and sexual favors. Neither respects the other's lifestyle, but Billy nonetheless agrees to drive her to California, stopping at karaoke bars for her to compete along the way.

All three pairs end up at the Omaha contest, each having won the right to compete there for $5,000 after winning in a smaller town. Finally accepting his daughter, Ricky invites her to perform a duet of her mother's favorite song, "Cruisin'". Billy discovers that Suzi has stage fright when he finds her in the ladies' room, vomiting, but he convinces her to compete. Reggie sees the police arrive, investigating the service station shooting. Performing an a cappella version of "Free Bird", he pulls his gun on stage, prompting police to shoot him; putting the full blame for the service station shooting on Reggie, and freeing Todd to return to his family.

After the contest, Billy and Suzi continue on their way to California. Billy invites Liv (with whom he had been flirting at the contest) and Ricky to join them, and they resolve to take a slight detour to another karaoke contest in Nevada. Todd and Candy fly home together on his frequent flyer miles.

Cast

 Gwyneth Paltrow as Liv Dean
 Huey Lewis as Ricky Dean
 Maria Bello as Suzi Loomis
 Andre Braugher as Reggie Kane
 Paul Giamatti as Todd Woods
 Scott Speedman as Billy Hannan
 Lochlyn Munro as Ronny Jackson
 Angie Dickinson as Blair

 John Pinette as Finals singer
 Michael Bublé as Finals singer
 Maya Rudolph as Omaha Hostess
 Keegan Connor Tracy as Shelia
 Kiersten Warren as Candy Woods
 Marian Seldes as Harriet Gahagan
 Brent Butt as Hotel clerk
 Aaron Pearl as Buddy
 Steve Oatway as Ralph Beckerman

Production
Bruce Paltrow spent several years trying to get the project started. The film was produced outside Disney's main production channels and was acquired and financed by Buena Vista Film Sales and was distributed through Hollywood Pictures.

This was the only time Gwyneth Paltrow and her producer/director father Bruce Paltrow worked together on a film project, and it was also Bruce Paltrow's last production before his death.

Brad Pitt was first cast in Speedman's role, but, after he and Gwyneth Paltrow announced the end of their off-camera romance, Pitt decided not to take the role.

Film locations
The film locations include Las Vegas, Nevada; British Columbia, Canada; and Los Angeles, California.

Reception
The film received a 21% on Rotten Tomatoes according to 92 critics, with the consensus being "Duets suffers from sloppy direction and stretches credibility. Also, the characters are uninteresting and it's hard to care about what happens to them."

Film critic Roger Ebert gave the film a thumbs down on his television program, and wrote on his newspaper review, "Duets has little islands of humor and even perfection, floating in a sea of missed marks and murky intentions." Kenneth Turan, film critic for the Los Angeles Times, described the film as "six characters in search of a movie. Any movie will do..."

Critic Bob Graham, writing for the San Francisco Chronicle, liked the spirit of the film and the acting, and he wrote, "Cut 'Duets' some slack. This is an appealing, and ultimately moving, ensemble comedy/drama about ordinary folks whose one chance at anything resembling stardom is a karaoke contest...The fable style is a fragile one. The Ally McBeal test probably applies here. Fans of that show are likely to give themselves over to Duets, too."

Variety critic Todd McCarthy singled out Giamatti's work and character, writing, "Giamatti gets the lion's share of Byrum's good lines and if the film is to go over with auds, it will be largely due to this character and performance, which reps one of the funniest sustained rants against the lowest common denominator in American culture that has been seen in ages."

Overall, many critics echoed Stephanie Zacharek's review in Salon.com.  She wrote, "Its three interlocking stories don't find the right rhythmic balance, and some of the dialogue is stiff and mannered." Zacharek did praise the acting and the film's message. She added, "In that respect, the way Duets treats its characters is refreshing. There are brief moments when it reminds us that plenty of people enjoy karaoke at the expense of their audience (during one scene an Asian businessman warbles tunelessly in the background), but Duets isn't out to make anyone look ridiculous."

Distribution
The producers marketed the film using the following tagline:

The film was first presented at the Toronto International Film Festival on September 9, 2000. When released nationwide on September 15, 2000, it suffered at the box office. The first week's gross sales at the box office was $2,002,588 (581 screens) and the total receipts for the run were $4,734,235.

In its widest release the film was featured in 583 theaters and the film was in circulation for seven weeks. The production budget was $16,000,000.

Home media

A VHS videocassette and DVD of the film was released on May 8, 2001 by Hollywood Pictures Home Entertainment. The DVD contained additional features: a commentary track by director Bruce Paltrow and producer Kevin Jones, additional scenes, conversations with director Bruce Paltrow, and a multi-angle music video of "Cruisin'."

A bare bones Blu-ray version of the film was released on May 15, 2012 from Mill Creek Entertainment. Kino Lorber, porting over the bonus material on the DVD, re-released it on Blu-ray on May 5, 2019.

Soundtrack

An original motion picture soundtrack album was released on September 12, 2000, by Hollywood Records. The CD contained twelve tracks, including original music composed for the film by David Newman. Actors Huey Lewis, Gwyneth Paltrow, Paul Giamatti, and Maria Bello all performed the songs featured in the film, while professional vocalist Arnold McCuller sings all of Andre Braugher's parts including the a cappella version of Lynyrd Skynyrd's "Free Bird".

The soundtrack spawned two hit singles in Australia, including Gwyneth Paltrow and Huey Lewis' "Cruisin'" which spent two weeks at No. 1. and Paltrow's "Bette Davis Eyes" which hit # 3 there. Cruisin' did even better in New Zealand,  spending five weeks at No. 1.

Michael Bublé has a cameo singing "Strangers in the Night", but the song is not included on the soundtrack.

Certifications

References

External links
 
 
 
 
  (Paul Giamatti and Andre Braugher)

2000 films
2000s musical comedy-drama films
American musical comedy-drama films
2000s English-language films
Films about music and musicians
Films shot in Vancouver
Hollywood Pictures films
2000s road comedy-drama films
American road comedy-drama films
Beacon Pictures films
Films scored by David Newman
2000 comedy films
2000 drama films
Films about father–daughter relationships
2000s American films